First Creek is a stream in the U.S. state of Missouri. It is a tributary of Second Creek.

First Creek was so named for the fact it is the closest stream to a nearby drainage divide.

See also
List of rivers of Missouri

References

Rivers of Clay County, Missouri
Rivers of Platte County, Missouri
Rivers of Missouri